Chicago 18 is the fifteenth studio album by the American band Chicago, released on September 29, 1986. This album is the first without cofounding member Peter Cetera, and the first to feature Jason Scheff on bass guitar and vocals.

With Cetera having been fired by the band in 1985 because he wanted to record a solo album, Chicago eventually hired Scheff to fill Cetera's position as vocalist and bassist. With Scheff and Bill Champlin, who had joined the band in 1981, the most prominent voices in Chicago now belonged to its two newest recruits.

Chicago again hired producer David Foster to create a followup to Chicago 17.

The band recorded an updated, high-tech remake of their classic "25 or 6 to 4" (#48). Scheff recalled when he asked Foster on the way he should sing the song, the latter responded: "Just like Cetera." The following singles, "Will You Still Love Me?" (#3) and "If She Would Have Been Faithful..." (#17) became hits. Scheff was lead vocalist on all three releases. The album also features a brief instrumental horn riff, Pankow's "Free Flight."  

Despite the success of its predecessor, Chicago 18 ultimately only went gold, peaking at #35 on the Billboard Top 200 charts.

Reception

Chicago 18 (Full Moon/Warner Bros. 25509) reached gold status and #35 in the US during a chart stay of 45 weeks. It did not chart in the UK.

Track listing

Notes:
A re-recorded version of "When Will the World Be Like Lovers?" (Robert Lamm/Tom Keane/David Foster) appears on Robert Lamm's 1995 solo album Life Is Good In My Neighborhood. The original recorded version from the Chicago 18 sessions also appears online.
"Free Flight", a short unlisted instrumental composed by James Pankow, appears at the beginning of "Nothin's Gonna Stop Us Now".

Personnel

Chicago 
 Bill Champlin – keyboards, vocals
 Robert Lamm – keyboards, vocals
 Lee Loughnane – trumpet
 James Pankow – trombone, brass arrangements
 Walter Parazaider – woodwinds
 Jason Scheff – bass, vocals
 Danny Seraphine – drums, drum programming
 Vocal arrangements by Chicago, Bill Champlin, and David Foster

Additional musicians 
 David Foster – keyboards, additional arrangements, brass contributions
 Tom Keane – keyboards, backing vocals
 Michael Boddicker – synthesizer programming
 David Boruff – synthesizer programming
 Rhett Lawrence – synthesizer programming
 Bo Tomlyn – synthesizer programming
 Michael Landau – guitars
 Howard "Buzz" Feiten – guitars
 Steve Lukather – guitars
 Jeremy Lubbock – string arrangements on "If She Would Have Been Faithful...", "Will You Still Love Me?", and "I Believe"
 Jules Chakin – string contractor
 Gerald Vinci – concertmaster
 Betty Joyce – kids choir contractor on "One More Day"
 Jon Joyce – kids choir conductor on "One More Day"
 Rebecca Clinger, Christopher Leach, Julie Leach, Myhanh Tran, Peter Wade, Jason Pasol, Brandon Roberts, Alitzah Wiener, Betty Joyce, Laurie Parazaider, Felicia Parazaider, Melody Wright and Bettina Bush – kids choir on "One More Day"

Production 
 Produced by David Foster
 Engineered and Mixed by Humberto Gatica
 Recorded at Chartmaker Studios (Malibu, CA) and Lion Share Recording Studio (Los Angeles, CA), assisted by Claudio Ordenes and Ray Pyle.
 Horn Sessions recorded at Skyline Recording Company (Malibu, CA), assisted by Britt Bacon and David Garfield.
 Mixed at Lion Share Recording Studio, assisted by Laura Livingston. 
 Originally mastered by George Marino at Sterling Sound (New York, NY).
 CDD Pre-mastering by WCI Record Group
 Art Direction – Jeffrey Kent Ayeroff
 Design – Hugh Brown and Jeri McManus
 Album Cover (Mosaic) – Maria Sarno
 Photography – Hugh Brown
 Stylist/Wardrobe – Kali Korn
 Group Photography – Guy Webster

Charts

References

Further reading
 

Chicago (band) albums
1986 albums
Albums produced by David Foster
Full Moon Records albums
Warner Records albums